David Wanzenried is a state senator representing the 49th district of Montana, representing parts of the city of Missoula and Missoula County, since 2006. He is a member of the Democratic party. Previously, he had been elected to the state House of Representatives for the 92nd district, serving Missoula and also Evergreen, near Kalispell from 1990 to 2004.

References

External links
Montana Senate - David E. Wanzenreid official MT State Legislature website
Project Vote Smart - Senator David E. 'Dave' Wanzenreid (MT) profile
Follow the Money - David E Wanzenreid
2006 2004 2002 2000  1992 1990 campaign contributions

1948 births
Living people
Democratic Party Montana state senators
Democratic Party members of the Montana House of Representatives
Politicians from Missoula, Montana